Ivan's Hundred was an association of merchants which existed in the 12th-15th centuries in Novgorod Republic. The association gathered around the Church of St. John the Forerunner (Церковь Ивана Предтечи на Опоках) in Novgorod and consisted of merchants who traded wax wholesale. The starostas (heads) of the Ivan's Hundred were permanent members of the Commerce Court of Novgorod and ruling Council of the Novgorod Republic. They also took part in signing trade agreements. The rights and responsibilities of the members of the Ivan's Hundred were stated in the so-called Charter (Устав) and Manuscript (Рукописание) of knyaz Vsevolod Mstislavich. Each member had to pay an entrance fee of 50 grivnas of silver and additionally to give a bolt of Ypres cloth (from Flanders) to the tysyastsky. The tysyatsky arbitrated disputes between the members.

References

Novgorod Republic